Yuquan Subdistrict is a subdistrict in Meitan County, Guizhou, China. , it administers the following three residential neighborhoods and four villages:
Neighborhoods
Yuquan
Yuhe
Xinshi

Villages
Xiangushan Village
Lianhe Village
Jinqiao Village
Tutang Village

See also 
 List of township-level divisions of Guizhou

References 

Subdistricts of Zunyi
Meitan County